Insaniyat (Hindi: इंसानियत, English: Humanity) is a 1994 Indian Hindi-language action thriller film directed by Ramanjit Juneja. The film features an ensemble cast of Amitabh Bachchan, Sunny Deol, Jaya Prada, Raveena Tandon, Chunky Panday, Vinod Mehra, Nutan, Anupam Kher, Prem Chopra, Alok Nath and Aftab Shivdasani.

The film began production in 1989 and was originally set for release in 1991. Two of the film's stars Vinod Mehra and Nutan died before the film's delayed release in 1994. At the time of the film's release, Amitabh Bachchan had retired temporarily from films since 1992. Upon release, the film received mainly negative reviews from critics and was an average grosser at the box office.

Synopsis
SSP Amar Nath Singh (Amitabh Bachchan) breaks in to the fortress of criminal Goga, bashes him up and arrests him. Incidentally Goga was the one responsible for Amar's separation from his parents Hardayal (Alok Nath) and Shanti Devi (Nutan). He takes him to the police headquarters where he commits suicide. But he comes to know that Goga has a son Brijbhan (Anupam Kher) who is now a high profile criminal with whom several police officers and Indian army officers are working to spread terrorism in India. Also, Brijbhan has kept Amar's childhood sweetheart Shalu (Jaya Prada) in his captivity as his mistress. To stop them, Amar decides to unite two warring gangsters Karim (Sunny Deol) and Harihan (Chunky Panday) who are constantly at loggerheads with each other due to their different religious backgrounds. Both of them regard Amar as their elder brother. They are also involved in their respective romances with Salma (Raveena Tandon) and Radha (Sonam).

A reporter gets hold of some evidence which proves the collusion of some army officers with Brijbhan. In response Brijbhan sends his goons to kill him. The murder is witnessed by Nandu (Vinod Mehra). Incidentally, Nandu is the other son of Shanti Devi, Amar's long-lost mother. Unaware of this, Amar meets him at his house and manages to convince him to testify. He also avails the required police protection for Nandu. However, despite all this, Nandu is killed by Brijbhan's men on the way to court. Shanti Devi admonishes Amar for his failure to protect him. Angered by this and the constant taunts of the criminals, Amar shoots them dead in full public view. He surrenders and is put on trial. In court, he confesses his crime and is sentenced to death by hanging. This event manages to bring Karim and Hari together. They forget all their differences and resolve to continue the battle between patriots and terrorists. They get hold of corrupt police officer Lotaram (Prem Chopra) who is on Brijbhan's payroll, and extract a lot of information regarding Brijbhan's plans to spread terrorism. Concurrently, Shanti Devi finds out that Amar is actually her long-lost son, and goes to meet him in prison. Also, at the same time, Shalu manages to escape Brijbhan's captivity. She meets Amar in jail, and the two long-lost lovers have an emotional reunion. However Brijbhan, in a disguise, manages to capture Shalu again. 

At the time when Amar was being taken to the gallows to be hanged, Shalu, having lost all hope of being with Amar, consumes poison. Having somehow anticipated this, Amar makes a dramatic escape from the gallows and goes into hiding. On the way, he runs into his little sister Munni, who, owing to the recent events, had lost her mental balance and had become insane. Karim and Hari invade Brijbhan's fortress and begin decimating it. Salma users herself as a bait to trap a high-ranking army officer, who is killed by Karim. The poison's effect begins to show as Shalu collapses while dancing for Brijbhan. Shanti Devi begins to madly beat a drum to satisfy Brijbhan.

At the same time, Amar arrives with Munni, and a full-fledged fight ensues. Many of the terrorists are killed. Seeing this, an enraged Brijbhan fires at Shanti Devi, but Amar comes in between and is shot. Brijbhan kidnaps Munni and escapes. Amar givens chase, in the course of which he gets shot a few more times. He manages to catch up though, and rescues Munni. He brings Brijbhan back to his fortress and leaves him to be killed by Karim and Hari. Brijbhan meets his end at the hands of the duo.

Amar collapses due to his wounds. Shanti Devi begs him not to die, as she had already lost a son once. He assures her that Karim and Hari will take care of her. Amar then moves towards a dying Shalu, and both the lovers breath their last in each other's arms, as the end credits roll.

Cast
 Amitabh Bachchan as SSP Amar Nath Singh
 Sunny Deol as Karim Lala
 Jaya Prada as Shalu a.k.a. Champabai
 Raveena Tandon as Salma
 Chunky Panday as Hariharan
 Vinod Mehra as Nandu
 Nutan as Shanti Devi
 Anupam Kher as Brijbhan
 Sonam as Radha
 Prem Chopra as Police Inspector Lotaram
 Alok Nath as Hardayal (Amar's Father)
 Aftab Shivdasani as young Amar
 Shafi Inamdar as Police Commissioner Shafi
 Sadashiv Amrapurkar as Deshpande
 Pallavi Joshi as Munni (Nandu's/Amar's Sister) 
 Goga Kapoor as Goga
 Rakesh Bedi as Dead Body

Soundtrack
The film score was composed by Louis Banks. Rajesh Roshan composed the songs for the album and a huge assembly of singers like Lata Mangeshkar, Asha Bhosle, Sadhana Sargam, Mohammed Aziz, Shabbir Kumar, Anwar, Anuradha Paudwal, Sapna Mukherjee, Sudesh Bhosle, Vipin Sachdev, Udit Narayan, Kumar Sanu,  Mangal Singh and Padmini Roy lent their voice in this album. The song "Saathi Tera Pyar Pooja Hai" became an evergreen song.

Track listing

References

External links 
 

1990s Hindi-language films
1994 films
Films scored by Rajesh Roshan